Magnificent Seven or Magnificent 7 may refer to:

Media

Film
 The Magnificent Seven, a 1960 western film
 Return of The Magnificent Seven, a 1966 western film
 Guns of the Magnificent Seven, a 1969 western film
 The Magnificent Seven Deadly Sins, a 1971 motion picture
 The Magnificent Seven Ride!, a 1972 western film
 The Magnificent Seven (2016 film), a 2016 remake of the 1960 western film
Magnificent 7, a 2005 television film based on the family of English writer Jacqui Jackson

Music
 The Magnificent 7 (album), by The Supremes and The Four Tops
 "The Magnificent Seven" (song), a single by The Clash

Television
 The Magnificent Seven (TV series), a 1998–2000 television series based on the 1960 film
 "Magnificent Seven", a 1993 episode of the Fox Network sitcom Married... with Children
 "The Magnificent Seven" (Supernatural), a 2007 episode of the television series

Sports
 Magnificent Seven (gymnastics), 1996 United States Olympic Women's Gymnastics Team
 The Magnificent Seven (professional wrestling), a group of WCW professional wrestling heels in 2001
The Magnificent Seven, an alternative nickname to the Unsinkable Seven, the seven survivor competitors of the 1963 and 1968 East African Safari Rally
 Magnificent Seven, two nicknames of thoroughbred horse racing meetings in which jockeys achieved seven victories in a single day:
 Frankie Dettori at Ascot Racecourse, 1996
 Richard Hughes (jockey) at Windsor Racecourse, 2012

Others
 Magnificent Seven cemeteries, a group of London cemeteries constructed in the 19th century
 The Magnificent Seven, a set of seven attainment badges created by Scouting Ireland S.A.I. in the late 1990s
 The Magnificent Seven (neutron stars), a nickname for a group of nearby isolated neutron stars
 Magnificent Seven elephants, a set of bull elephants with particularly large tusks living in Kruger National Park
 Magnificent Seven (Port of Spain), a group of mansions located in northern Port of Spain, Trinidad and Tobago

7 (number)